In Defense of Marxism may refer to:
A collection of texts from Leon Trotsky, published in 1942, mostly dealing about the nature of the USSR.
A website operated by the International Marxist Tendency